Sharswood is a small neighborhood in the North Philadelphia section of the city of Philadelphia, Pennsylvania. It is located to the east of Brewerytown, north of Girard College, west of Ridge Avenue, and south of the Norman Blumberg apartment towers. It is often grouped with Brewerytown, as in the Brewerytown-Sharswood Community Civic Association, and the Brewerytown-Sharswood NTI Planning Area.

References

Neighborhoods in Philadelphia
Lower North Philadelphia